Timothy Edward Ryan (born September 8, 1967) is a former National Football League (NFL) defensive tackle. He is currently a radio color analyst for the San Francisco 49ers, and previously an NFL analyst for Fox television and co-host of "Movin' the Chains" on Sirius XM NFL Radio.

High school career 
Tim played for the Oak Grove Eagles high school varsity football team from 1983 to 1985 where he started on both the offensive and defensive line and was a Mercury-News All-CCS selection.

College career 
A two-time All-American (1988, 1989) at the University of Southern California, Ryan is the all-time leading tackler in school history. The former team captain led the Trojans to three Rose Bowls and holds the team season-record for sacks with 20.

Ryan started the season opener against Illinois in 1986 as the first true freshman since Riki Ellison in 1978.

Professional career 
Ryan was a third-round draft choice (61st pick overall) in the 1990 NFL draft and played for the Chicago Bears between 1990 and 1993.

Sportscasting career 
Ryan has been commenting NFL games since 2002. For 12 years, he served as a color analyst for Fox NFL telecasts, teaming with various play-by-play announcers including Chris Myers, Sam Rosen, Curt Menefee, and Ron Pitts. (Ryan is not to be confused with another sportscaster also named Tim Ryan, who called play-by-play for Fox in 1998.) Ryan also teamed with Matt Vasgersian for the 2009 Fiesta Bowl, replacing Terry Donahue and Pat Haden. He also worked for Sirius NFL Radio (Channel 88), hosting "Movin' the Chains" from 3-7pm with Pat Kirwan and doing analysis for San Francisco 49ers preseason games. He is a regular contributor to KGMZ radio ("95.7 The Game") in the Bay Area.`

It was announced by Pat Kirwan during the September 2, 2013 broadcast of "Movin' the Chains" on SiriusXM radio that Ryan had accepted an enhanced opportunity with FOX Sports and would not be returning to "Movin' the Chains".  His hosting duties in that show were assumed by Jim Miller, former NFL quarterback for the Chicago Bears.

In January 2014 it was announced that Ryan was leaving FOX Sports to replace Eric Davis as color analyst for the San Francisco 49ers radio network. Since the onset of the 49ers 2019 season, Ryan has teamed up with play-by-play announcer Greg Papa on radio broadcasts. In December 2019, Ryan was suspended as the 49ers' color analyst due to a controversial comment made on the Murph and Mac show on KNBR Radio about Baltimore Ravens quarterback Lamar Jackson's success at faking hand-offs due to his dark skin and the dark color of the football, and the dark color of his uniform.

References 

1967 births
Living people
All-American college football players
American football defensive linemen
Chicago Bears players
College football announcers
National Football League announcers
Players of American football from Memphis, Tennessee
San Francisco 49ers announcers
Sportspeople from Memphis, Tennessee
USC Trojans football players